Intermezzo, Op. 72, is a comic opera in two acts by Richard Strauss to his own German libretto, described as a  (bourgeois comedy with symphonic interludes). It premiered at the Dresden Semperoper on 4 November 1924, with sets that reproduced Strauss' home in Garmisch. The first Vienna performance was in January 1927.

Background
The story depicts fictionally the personalities of Strauss himself (as "Robert Storch") and his wife Pauline (as "Christine") and was based on real incidents in their lives. Pauline Strauss was not aware of the opera's subject before the first performance. After Lotte Lehmann had congratulated Pauline on this "marvelous present to you from your husband", Pauline's reply was reported as "I don't give a damn". The most celebrated excerpts from the opera are the orchestral interludes between scenes.

His usual librettist up to that time, Hugo von Hofmannsthal, refused to work on the opera and suggested that Strauss himself write the libretto, which he eventually did after having been refused by other writers. This is why the libretto is not in verse but in prose and even mimics the dialect used by the servants in the play, against the more polished German of the principals.

The opera's title is intended to refer to the intermezzi that used to be staged during the intermissions of serious operas during the 18th century, sort of mini-comic-operas, easy to follow with themes usually about marital confusions and other light comedies.

Performance history
The UK premiere was at the Glyndebourne Opera on 20 September 1974 (sung in English), with subsequent productions in 1975 and 1983 (with a BBC Broadcast on 26 August 1983).

The first professional staged US production was at the Santa Fe Opera in 1984, translated into English.

Roles

Synopsis
Setting: Vienna and Grundlsee during a 1920s winter

The composer Storch is leaving for a conducting tour, and his wife Christine helps him pack, arguing and nagging along the way. Seeking relief from loneliness she goes tobogganing and collides with a skier, a young Baron who befriends her. They dance together at a ball and she arranges for him to lodge in the house of her notary. The friendship is soured when the Baron asks Christine for financial assistance. She opens a letter, supposedly for her husband, from a lady arranging an assignation. She immediately telegrams Storch demanding they part for ever. In tears, she seeks solace in her son's bedroom but he defends his father.

Storch is playing skat with friends in Vienna when the telegram arrives, and is bewildered by the accusations. Stroh, a conductor friend, admits that he knows the lady and surmises that his and Storch's surnames must have been confused. Christine visits the notary to demand a divorce, but he is unwilling to pursue the matter. She sends the Baron to Vienna to gather evidence of infidelity. Packing to leave, she receives a telegram from her husband saying that Stroh will explain the misunderstanding. Even after Stroh's visit she is reluctant to accept the truth. Storch returns home, and an argument ensues. The Baron arrives with evidence that Stroh rather than Storch had indeed known the lady and Christine dismisses him, assured that her husband is blameless. Storch forgives her anger and teases her about her dalliance with the Baron. Husband and wife declare a renewed love.

Instrumentation
Strauss scored Intermezzo for the following orchestra:

Woodwinds: 2 flutes (flute 2 doubles piccolo), 2 oboes (oboe 2 doubles English Horn), 2 clarinets in B-flat (clarinet 2 doubles bass clarinet in A), 2 bassoons (2nd bassoon must play low A in act 2)
Brass: 3 horns (in F, E, D, E-flat, and A), 2 trumpets (in C), 2 trombones
Percussion: timpani, suspended cymbals, crash cymbals, snare drum, triangle, bass drum, pair of [sleigh] bells
Keyboards: piano, harmonium
Strings: harp, violins I (11), violins II (9), violas (5), violoncelli (5), contrabasses (3)

Recordings

References

External links

Operas by Richard Strauss
German-language operas
Operas
1924 operas
Operas set in Austria
Operas set in Vienna